Aristotle (Aristotélēs, ; 384–322 BC) was an Ancient Greek philosopher and polymath. His writings cover a broad range of subjects including physics, biology, zoology, metaphysics, logic, ethics, aesthetics, poetry, drama, music, rhetoric, psychology, linguistics, economics, politics, meteorology, geology, and government. As the founder of the Peripatetic school of philosophy in the Lyceum in Athens, he began the wider Aristotelian tradition that followed, which set the groundwork for the development of modern science. 

Little is known about Aristotle's life. He was born in the city of Stagira in Northern Greece during the Classical period. His father, Nicomachus, died when Aristotle was a child, and he was brought up by a guardian. At seventeen or eighteen years of age he joined Plato's Academy in Athens and remained there until the age of thirty-seven. Shortly after Plato died, Aristotle left Athens and, at the request of Philip II of Macedon, tutored his son Alexander the Great beginning in 343 BC. He established a library in the Lyceum which helped him to produce many of his hundreds of books on papyrus scrolls. 

Though Aristotle wrote many elegant treatises and dialogues for publication, only around a third of his original output has survived, none of it intended for publication. Aristotle provided a complex synthesis of the various philosophies existing prior to him. It was above all from his teachings that the West inherited its intellectual lexicon, as well as problems and methods of inquiry. As a result, his philosophy has exerted a unique influence on almost every form of knowledge in the West and it continues to be a subject of contemporary philosophical discussion.

Aristotle's views profoundly shaped medieval scholarship. The influence of physical science extended from Late Antiquity and the Early Middle Ages into the Renaissance, and were not replaced systematically until the Enlightenment and theories such as classical mechanics were developed. Some of Aristotle's zoological observations found in his biology, such as on the hectocotyl (reproductive) arm of the octopus, were disbelieved until the 19th century. He also influenced Judeo-Islamic philosophies during the Middle Ages, as well as Christian theology, especially the Neoplatonism of the Early Church and the scholastic tradition of the Catholic Church. Aristotle was revered among medieval Muslim scholars as "The First Teacher", and among medieval Christians like Thomas Aquinas as simply "The Philosopher", while the poet Dante called him "the master of those who know". His works contain the earliest known formal study of logic, and were studied by medieval scholars such as Peter Abelard and John Buridan. Aristotle's influence on logic continued well into the 19th century. In addition, his ethics, though always influential, gained renewed interest with the modern advent of virtue ethics.

Life 
In general, the details of Aristotle's life are not well-established. The biographies written in ancient times are often speculative and historians only agree on a few salient points.

Aristotle was born in 384 BC in Stagira, Chalcidice, about 55 km (34 miles) east of modern-day Thessaloniki. His father, Nicomachus, was the personal physician to King Amyntas of Macedon. While he was young, Aristotle learned about biology and medical information, which was taught by his father. Both of Aristotle's parents died when he was about thirteen, and Proxenus of Atarneus became his guardian. Although little information about Aristotle's childhood has survived, he probably spent some time within the Macedonian palace, making his first connections with the Macedonian monarchy.

At the age of seventeen or eighteen, Aristotle moved to Athens to continue his education at Plato's Academy. He probably experienced the Eleusinian Mysteries as he wrote when describing the sights one viewed at the Eleusinian Mysteries, "to experience is to learn" [παθείν μαθεĩν]. Aristotle remained in Athens for nearly twenty years before leaving in 348/47 BC. The traditional story about his departure records that he was disappointed with the Academy's direction after control passed to Plato's nephew Speusippus, although it is possible that he feared the anti-Macedonian sentiments in Athens at that time and left before Plato died. Aristotle then accompanied Xenocrates to the court of his friend Hermias of Atarneus in Asia Minor. After the death of Hermias, Aristotle travelled with his pupil Theophrastus to the island of Lesbos, where together they researched the botany and zoology of the island and its sheltered lagoon. While in Lesbos, Aristotle married Pythias, either Hermias's adoptive daughter or niece. She bore him a daughter, whom they also named Pythias. In 343 BC, Aristotle was invited by Philip II of Macedon to become the tutor to his son Alexander.

Aristotle was appointed as the head of the royal academy of Macedon. During Aristotle's time in the Macedonian court, he gave lessons not only to Alexander but also to two other future kings: Ptolemy and Cassander. Aristotle encouraged Alexander toward eastern conquest, and Aristotle's own attitude towards Persia was unabashedly ethnocentric. In one famous example, he counsels Alexander to be "a leader to the Greeks and a despot to the barbarians, to look after the former as after friends and relatives, and to deal with the latter as with beasts or plants". By 335 BC, Aristotle had returned to Athens, establishing his own school there known as the Lyceum. Aristotle conducted courses at the school for the next twelve years. While in Athens, his wife Pythias died and Aristotle became involved with Herpyllis of Stagira, who bore him a son whom he named after his father, Nicomachus. If the Suda  an uncritical compilation from the Middle Ages  is accurate, he may also have had an erômenos, Palaephatus of Abydus.

This period in Athens, between 335 and 323 BC, is when Aristotle is believed to have composed many of his works. He wrote many dialogues, of which only fragments have survived. Those works that have survived are in treatise form and were not, for the most part, intended for widespread publication; they are generally thought to be lecture aids for his students. His most important treatises include Physics, Metaphysics, Nicomachean Ethics, Politics, On the Soul and Poetics. Aristotle studied and made significant contributions to "logic, metaphysics, mathematics, physics, biology, botany, ethics, politics, agriculture, medicine, dance, and theatre."

Near the end of his life, Alexander and Aristotle became estranged over Alexander's relationship with Persia and Persians. A widespread tradition in antiquity suspected Aristotle of playing a role in Alexander's death, but the only evidence of this is an unlikely claim made some six years after the death. Following Alexander's death, anti-Macedonian sentiment in Athens was rekindled. In 322 BC, Demophilus and Eurymedon the Hierophant reportedly denounced Aristotle for impiety, prompting him to flee to his mother's family estate in Chalcis, on Euboea, at which occasion he was said to have stated: "I will not allow the Athenians to sin twice against philosophy" – a reference to Athens's trial and execution of Socrates. He died in Chalcis, Euboea of natural causes later that same year, having named his student Antipater as his chief executor and leaving a will in which he asked to be buried next to his wife.

Theoretical philosophy

Logic 

With the Prior Analytics, Aristotle is credited with the earliest study of formal logic, and his conception of it was the dominant form of Western logic until 19th-century advances in mathematical logic. Kant stated in the Critique of Pure Reason that with Aristotle logic reached its completion.

Organon 

What is today called Aristotelian logic with its types of syllogism (methods of logical argument), Aristotle himself would have labelled "analytics". The term "logic" he reserved to mean dialectics. Most of Aristotle's work is probably not in its original form, because it was most likely edited by students and later lecturers. The logical works of Aristotle were compiled into a set of six books called the Organon around 40 BC by Andronicus of Rhodes or others among his followers. The books are:
 Categories
 On Interpretation
 Prior Analytics
 Posterior Analytics
 Topics
 On Sophistical Refutations

The order of the books (or the teachings from which they are composed) is not certain, but this list was derived from analysis of Aristotle's writings. It goes from the basics, the analysis of simple terms in the Categories, the analysis of propositions and their elementary relations in On Interpretation, to the study of more complex forms, namely, syllogisms (in the Analytics) and dialectics (in the Topics and Sophistical Refutations). The first three treatises form the core of the logical theory stricto sensu: the grammar of the language of logic and the correct rules of reasoning. The Rhetoric is not conventionally included, but it states that it relies on the Topics.

Metaphysics 

The word "metaphysics" appears to have been coined by the first century AD editor who assembled various small selections of Aristotle's works to the treatise we know by the name Metaphysics. Aristotle called it "first philosophy", and distinguished it from mathematics and natural science (physics) as the contemplative (theoretikē) philosophy which is "theological" and studies the divine. He wrote in his Metaphysics (1026a16):

Substance 

Aristotle examines the concepts of substance (ousia) and essence (to ti ên einai, "the what it was to be") in his Metaphysics (Book VII), and he concludes that a particular substance is a combination of both matter and form, a philosophical theory called hylomorphism. In Book VIII, he distinguishes the matter of the substance as the substratum, or the stuff of which it is composed. For example, the matter of a house is the bricks, stones, timbers, etc., or whatever constitutes the potential house, while the form of the substance is the actual house, namely 'covering for bodies and chattels' or any other differentia that let us define something as a house. The formula that gives the components is the account of the matter, and the formula that gives the differentia is the account of the form.

Immanent realism 

Like his teacher Plato, Aristotle's philosophy aims at the universal. Aristotle's ontology places the universal (katholou) in particulars (kath' hekaston), things in the world, whereas for Plato the universal is a separately existing form which actual things imitate. For Aristotle, "form" is still what phenomena are based on, but is "instantiated" in a particular substance.

Plato argued that all things have a universal form, which could be either a property or a relation to other things. When one looks at an apple, for example, one sees an apple, and one can also analyse a form of an apple. In this distinction, there is a particular apple and a universal form of an apple. Moreover, one can place an apple next to a book, so that one can speak of both the book and apple as being next to each other. Plato argued that there are some universal forms that are not a part of particular things. For example, it is possible that there is no particular good in existence, but "good" is still a proper universal form. Aristotle disagreed with Plato on this point, arguing that all universals are instantiated at some period of time, and that there are no universals that are unattached to existing things. In addition, Aristotle disagreed with Plato about the location of universals. Where Plato spoke of the forms as existing separately from the things that participate in them, Aristotle maintained that universals exist within each thing on which each universal is predicated. So, according to Aristotle, the form of apple exists within each apple, rather than in the world of the forms.

Potentiality and actuality 
Concerning the nature of change (kinesis) and its causes, as he outlines in his Physics and On Generation and Corruption (319b–320a), he distinguishes coming-to-be (genesis, also translated as 'generation') from:

 growth and diminution, which is change in quantity;
 locomotion, which is change in space; and
 alteration, which is change in quality.

Coming-to-be is a change where the substrate of the thing that has undergone the change has itself changed. In that particular change he introduces the concept of potentiality (dynamis) and actuality (entelecheia) in association with the matter and the form. Referring to potentiality, this is what a thing is capable of doing or being acted upon if the conditions are right and it is not prevented by something else. For example, the seed of a plant in the soil is potentially (dynamei) a plant, and if it is not prevented by something, it will become a plant. Potentially beings can either 'act' (poiein) or 'be acted upon' (paschein), which can be either innate or learned. For example, the eyes possess the potentiality of sight (innate – being acted upon), while the capability of playing the flute can be possessed by learning (exercise – acting). Actuality is the fulfilment of the end of the potentiality. Because the end (telos) is the principle of every change, and potentiality exists for the sake of the end, actuality, accordingly, is the end. Referring then to the previous example, it can be said that an actuality is when a plant does one of the activities that plants do.

In summary, the matter used to make a house has potentiality to be a house and both the activity of building and the form of the final house are actualities, which is also a final cause or end. Then Aristotle proceeds and concludes that the actuality is prior to potentiality in formula, in time and in substantiality. With this definition of the particular substance (i.e., matter and form), Aristotle tries to solve the problem of the unity of the beings, for example, "what is it that makes a man one"? Since, according to Plato there are two Ideas: animal and biped, how then is man a unity? However, according to Aristotle, the potential being (matter) and the actual one (form) are one and the same.

Epistemology 
Aristotle's immanent realism means his epistemology is based on the study of things that exist or happen in the world, and rises to knowledge of the universal, whereas for Plato epistemology begins with knowledge of universal Forms (or ideas) and descends to knowledge of particular imitations of these. Aristotle uses induction from examples alongside deduction, whereas Plato relies on deduction from a priori principles.

Natural philosophy 
Aristotle's "natural philosophy" spans a wide range of natural phenomena including those now covered by physics, biology and other natural sciences. In Aristotle's terminology, "natural philosophy" is a branch of philosophy examining the phenomena of the natural world, and includes fields that would be regarded today as physics, biology and other natural sciences. Aristotle's work encompassed virtually all facets of intellectual inquiry. Aristotle makes philosophy in the broad sense coextensive with reasoning, which he also would describe as "science". However, his use of the term science carries a different meaning than that covered by the term "scientific method". For Aristotle, "all science (dianoia) is either practical, poetical or theoretical" (Metaphysics 1025b25). His practical science includes ethics and politics; his poetical science means the study of fine arts including poetry; his theoretical science covers physics, mathematics and metaphysics.

Physics

Five elements 

In his On Generation and Corruption, Aristotle related each of the four elements proposed earlier by Empedocles, earth, water, air, and fire, to two of the four sensible qualities, hot, cold, wet, and dry. In the Empedoclean scheme, all matter was made of the four elements, in differing proportions. Aristotle's scheme added the heavenly aether, the divine substance of the heavenly spheres, stars and planets.

Motion 

Aristotle describes two kinds of motion: "violent" or "unnatural motion", such as that of a thrown stone, in the Physics (254b10), and "natural motion", such as of a falling object, in On the Heavens (300a20). In violent motion, as soon as the agent stops causing it, the motion stops also: in other words, the natural state of an object is to be at rest, since Aristotle does not address friction. With this understanding, it can be observed that, as Aristotle stated, heavy objects (on the ground, say) require more force to make them move; and objects pushed with greater force move faster. This would imply the equation

 ,

incorrect in modern physics.

Natural motion depends on the element concerned: the aether naturally moves in a circle around the heavens, while the 4 Empedoclean elements move vertically up (like fire, as is observed) or down (like earth) towards their natural resting places.

In the Physics (215a25), Aristotle effectively states a quantitative law, that the speed, v, of a falling body is proportional (say, with constant c) to its weight, W, and inversely proportional to the density, ρ, of the fluid in which it is falling:;

 

Aristotle implies that in a vacuum the speed of fall would become infinite, and concludes from this apparent absurdity that a vacuum is not possible. Opinions have varied on whether Aristotle intended to state quantitative laws. Henri Carteron held the "extreme view" that Aristotle's concept of force was basically qualitative, but other authors reject this.

Archimedes corrected Aristotle's theory that bodies move towards their natural resting places; metal boats can float if they displace enough water; floating depends in Archimedes' scheme on the mass and volume of the object, not, as Aristotle thought, its elementary composition.

Aristotle's writings on motion remained influential until the Early Modern period. John Philoponus (in the Middle Ages) and Galileo are said to have shown by experiment that Aristotle's claim that a heavier object falls faster than a lighter object is incorrect. A contrary opinion is given by Carlo Rovelli, who argues that Aristotle's physics of motion is correct within its domain of validity, that of objects in the Earth's gravitational field immersed in a fluid such as air. In this system, heavy bodies in steady fall indeed travel faster than light ones (whether friction is ignored, or not), and they do fall more slowly in a denser medium.

Newton's "forced" motion corresponds to Aristotle's "violent" motion with its external agent, but Aristotle's assumption that the agent's effect stops immediately it stops acting (e.g., the ball leaves the thrower's hand) has awkward consequences: he has to suppose that surrounding fluid helps to push the ball along to make it continue to rise even though the hand is no longer acting on it, resulting in the Medieval theory of impetus.

Four causes 

Aristotle suggested that the reason for anything coming about can be attributed to four different types of simultaneously active factors. His term aitia is traditionally translated as "cause", but it does not always refer to temporal sequence; it might be better translated as "explanation", but the traditional rendering will be employed here.
 Material cause describes the material out of which something is composed. Thus the material cause of a table is wood. It is not about action. It does not mean that one domino knocks over another domino.
 The formal cause is its form, i.e., the arrangement of that matter. It tells one what a thing is, that a thing is determined by the definition, form, pattern, essence, whole, synthesis or archetype. It embraces the account of causes in terms of fundamental principles or general laws, as the whole (i.e., macrostructure) is the cause of its parts, a relationship known as the whole-part causation. Plainly put, the formal cause is the idea in the mind of the sculptor that brings the sculpture into being. A simple example of the formal cause is the mental image or idea that allows an artist, architect, or engineer to create a drawing.
 The efficient cause is "the primary source", or that from which the change under consideration proceeds. It identifies 'what makes of what is made and what causes change of what is changed' and so suggests all sorts of agents, non-living or living, acting as the sources of change or movement or rest. Representing the current understanding of causality as the relation of cause and effect, this covers the modern definitions of "cause" as either the agent or agency or particular events or states of affairs. In the case of two dominoes, when the first is knocked over it causes the second also to fall over. In the case of animals, this agency is a combination of how it develops from the egg, and how its body functions.
 The final cause (telos) is its purpose, the reason why a thing exists or is done, including both purposeful and instrumental actions and activities. The final cause is the purpose or function that something is supposed to serve. This covers modern ideas of motivating causes, such as volition. In the case of living things, it implies adaptation to a particular way of life.

Optics 

Aristotle describes experiments in optics using a camera obscura in Problems, book 15. The apparatus consisted of a dark chamber with a small aperture that let light in. With it, he saw that whatever shape he made the hole, the sun's image always remained circular. He also noted that increasing the distance between the aperture and the image surface magnified the image.

Chance and spontaneity 

According to Aristotle, spontaneity and chance are causes of some things, distinguishable from other types of cause such as simple necessity. Chance as an incidental cause lies in the realm of accidental things, "from what is spontaneous". There is also more a specific kind of chance, which Aristotle names "luck", that only applies to people's moral choices.

Astronomy 

In astronomy, Aristotle refuted Democritus's claim that the Milky Way was made up of "those stars which are shaded by the earth from the sun's rays," pointing out correctly that if "the size of the sun is greater than that of the earth and the distance of the stars from the earth many times greater than that of the sun, then... the sun shines on all the stars and the earth screens none of them."

Geology and natural sciences 

Aristotle was one of the first people to record any geological observations. He stated that geological change was too slow to be observed in one person's lifetime.
The geologist Charles Lyell noted that Aristotle described such change, including "lakes that had dried up" and "deserts that had become watered by rivers", giving as examples the growth of the Nile delta since the time of Homer, and "the upheaving of one of the Aeolian islands, previous to a volcanic eruption."'
Aristotle also made many observations about the hydrologic cycle and meteorology (including his major writings "Meteorologica"). For example, he made some of the earliest observations about desalination: he observed early – and correctly – that when seawater is heated, freshwater evaporates and that the oceans are then replenished by the cycle of rainfall and river runoff ("I have proved by experiment that salt water evaporated forms fresh and the vapor does not when it condenses condense into sea water again.")

Biology

Empirical research 
Aristotle was the first person to study biology systematically, and biology forms a large part of his writings. He spent two years observing and describing the zoology of Lesbos and the surrounding seas, including in particular the Pyrrha lagoon in the centre of Lesbos. His data in History of Animals, Generation of Animals, Movement of Animals, and Parts of Animals are assembled from his own observations, statements given by people with specialized knowledge such as beekeepers and fishermen, and less accurate accounts provided by travellers from overseas. His apparent emphasis on animals rather than plants is a historical accident: his works on botany have been lost, but two books on plants by his pupil Theophrastus have survived.

Aristotle reports on the sea-life visible from observation on Lesbos and the catches of fishermen. He describes the catfish, electric ray, and frogfish in detail, as well as cephalopods such as the octopus and paper nautilus. His description of the hectocotyl arm of cephalopods, used in sexual reproduction, was widely disbelieved until the 19th century. He gives accurate descriptions of the four-chambered fore-stomachs of ruminants, and of the ovoviviparous embryological development of the hound shark.

He notes that an animal's structure is well matched to function, so, among birds, the heron, which lives in marshes with soft mud and lives by catching fish, has a long neck and long legs, and a sharp spear-like beak, whereas ducks that swim have short legs and webbed feet. Darwin, too, noted these sorts of differences between similar kinds of animal, but unlike Aristotle used the data to come to the theory of evolution. Aristotle's writings can seem to modern readers close to implying evolution, but while Aristotle was aware that new mutations or hybridizations could occur, he saw these as rare accidents. For Aristotle, accidents, like heat waves in winter, must be considered distinct from natural causes. He was thus critical of Empedocles's materialist theory of a "survival of the fittest" origin of living things and their organs, and ridiculed the idea that accidents could lead to orderly results. To put his views into modern terms, he nowhere says that different species can have a common ancestor, or that one kind can change into another, or that kinds can become extinct.

Scientific style 

Aristotle did not do experiments in the modern sense. He used the ancient Greek term pepeiramenoi to mean observations, or at most investigative procedures like dissection. In Generation of Animals, he finds a fertilized hen's egg of a suitable stage and opens it to see the embryo's heart beating inside.

Instead, he practiced a different style of science: systematically gathering data, discovering patterns common to whole groups of animals, and inferring possible causal explanations from these. This style is common in modern biology when large amounts of data become available in a new field, such as genomics. It does not result in the same certainty as experimental science, but it sets out testable hypotheses and constructs a narrative explanation of what is observed. In this sense, Aristotle's biology is scientific.

From the data he collected and documented, Aristotle inferred quite a number of rules relating the life-history features of the live-bearing tetrapods (terrestrial placental mammals) that he studied. Among these correct predictions are the following. Brood size decreases with (adult) body mass, so that an elephant has fewer young (usually just one) per brood than a mouse. Lifespan increases with gestation period, and also with body mass, so that elephants live longer than mice, have a longer period of gestation, and are heavier. As a final example, fecundity decreases with lifespan, so long-lived kinds like elephants have fewer young in total than short-lived kinds like mice.

Classification of living things 

Aristotle distinguished about 500 species of animals, arranging these in the History of Animals in a graded scale of perfection, a nonreligious version of the scala naturae, with man at the top. His system had eleven grades of animal, from highest potential to lowest, expressed in their form at birth: the highest gave live birth to hot and wet creatures, the lowest laid cold, dry mineral-like eggs. Animals came above plants, and these in turn were above minerals. He grouped what the modern zoologist would call vertebrates as the hotter "animals with blood", and below them the colder invertebrates as "animals without blood". Those with blood were divided into the live-bearing (mammals), and the egg-laying (birds, reptiles, fish). Those without blood were insects, crustacea (non-shelled – cephalopods, and shelled) and the hard-shelled molluscs (bivalves and gastropods). He recognised that animals did not exactly fit into a linear scale, and noted various exceptions, such as that sharks had a placenta like the tetrapods. To a modern biologist, the explanation, not available to Aristotle, is convergent evolution. Philosophers of science have generally concluded that Aristotle was not interested in taxonomy, but zoologists who studied this question in the early 21st century think otherwise. He believed that purposive final causes guided all natural processes; this teleological view justified his observed data as an expression of formal design.

Psychology

Soul 

Aristotle's psychology, given in his treatise On the Soul (peri psychēs), posits three kinds of soul ("psyches"): the vegetative soul, the sensitive soul, and the rational soul. Humans have a rational soul. The human soul incorporates the powers of the other kinds: Like the vegetative soul it can grow and nourish itself; like the sensitive soul it can experience sensations and move locally. The unique part of the human, rational soul is its ability to receive forms of other things and to compare them using the nous (intellect) and logos (reason).

For Aristotle, the soul is the form of a living being. Because all beings are composites of form and matter, the form of living beings is that which endows them with what is specific to living beings, e.g. the ability to initiate movement (or in the case of plants, growth and chemical transformations, which Aristotle considers types of movement). In contrast to earlier philosophers, but in accordance with the Egyptians, he placed the rational soul in the heart, rather than the brain. Notable is Aristotle's division of sensation and thought, which generally differed from the concepts of previous philosophers, with the exception of Alcmaeon.

In On the Soul, Aristotle famously criticizes Plato's theory of the soul and develops his own in response to Plato's. The first criticism is against Plato's view of the soul in the Timaeus that the soul takes up space and is able to come into physical contact with bodies. 20th-century scholarship overwhelmingly opposed Aristotle's interpretation of Plato and maintained that he had misunderstood Plato. Today's scholars have tended to re-assess Aristotle's interpretation and have warmed up to it. Aristotle's other criticism is that Plato's view of reincarnation entails that it is possible for a soul and its body to be mis-matched; in principle, Aristotle alleges, any soul can go with any body, according to Plato's theory. Aristotle's claim that the soul is the form of a living being is meant to eliminate that possibility and thus rule out reincarnation.

Memory 
According to Aristotle in On the Soul, memory is the ability to hold a perceived experience in the mind and to distinguish between the internal "appearance" and an occurrence in the past. In other words, a memory is a mental picture (phantasm) that can be recovered. Aristotle believed an impression is left on a semi-fluid bodily organ that undergoes several changes in order to make a memory. A memory occurs when stimuli such as sights or sounds are so complex that the nervous system cannot receive all the impressions at once. These changes are the same as those involved in the operations of sensation, Aristotelian , and thinking.

Aristotle uses the term 'memory' for the actual retaining of an experience in the impression that can develop from sensation, and for the intellectual anxiety that comes with the impression because it is formed at a particular time and processing specific contents. Memory is of the past, prediction is of the future, and sensation is of the present. Retrieval of impressions cannot be performed suddenly. A transitional channel is needed and located in past experiences, both for previous experience and present experience.

Because Aristotle believes people receive all kinds of sense perceptions and perceive them as impressions, people are continually weaving together new impressions of experiences. To search for these impressions, people search the memory itself. Within the memory, if one experience is offered instead of a specific memory, that person will reject this experience until they find what they are looking for. Recollection occurs when one retrieved experience naturally follows another. If the chain of "images" is needed, one memory will stimulate the next. When people recall experiences, they stimulate certain previous experiences until they reach the one that is needed. Recollection is thus the self-directed activity of retrieving the information stored in a memory impression. Only humans can remember impressions of intellectual activity, such as numbers and words. Animals that have perception of time can retrieve memories of their past observations. Remembering involves only perception of the things remembered and of the time passed.

Aristotle believed the chain of thought, which ends in recollection of certain impressions, was connected systematically in relationships such as similarity, contrast, and contiguity, described in his laws of association. Aristotle believed that past experiences are hidden within the mind. A force operates to awaken the hidden material to bring up the actual experience. According to Aristotle, association is the power innate in a mental state, which operates upon the unexpressed remains of former experiences, allowing them to rise and be recalled.

Dreams 

Aristotle describes sleep in On Sleep and Wakefulness. Sleep takes place as a result of overuse of the senses or of digestion, so it is vital to the body. While a person is asleep, the critical activities, which include thinking, sensing, recalling and remembering, do not function as they do during wakefulness. Since a person cannot sense during sleep they cannot have desire, which is the result of sensation. However, the senses are able to work during sleep, albeit differently, unless they are weary.

Dreams do not involve actually sensing a stimulus. In dreams, sensation is still involved, but in an altered manner. Aristotle explains that when a person stares at a moving stimulus such as the waves in a body of water, and then looks away, the next thing they look at appears to have a wavelike motion. When a person perceives a stimulus and the stimulus is no longer the focus of their attention, it leaves an impression. When the body is awake and the senses are functioning properly, a person constantly encounters new stimuli to sense and so the impressions of previously perceived stimuli are ignored. However, during sleep the impressions made throughout the day are noticed as there are no new distracting sensory experiences. So, dreams result from these lasting impressions. Since impressions are all that are left and not the exact stimuli, dreams do not resemble the actual waking experience. During sleep, a person is in an altered state of mind. Aristotle compares a sleeping person to a person who is overtaken by strong feelings toward a stimulus. For example, a person who has a strong infatuation with someone may begin to think they see that person everywhere because they are so overtaken by their feelings. Since a person sleeping is in a suggestible state and unable to make judgements, they become easily deceived by what appears in their dreams, like the infatuated person. This leads the person to believe the dream is real, even when the dreams are absurd in nature. In De Anima iii 3, Aristotle ascribes the ability to create, to store, and to recall images in the absence of perception to the faculty of imagination, phantasia.

One component of Aristotle's theory of dreams disagrees with previously held beliefs. He claimed that dreams are not foretelling and not sent by a divine being. Aristotle reasoned naturalistically that instances in which dreams do resemble future events are simply coincidences. Aristotle claimed that a dream is first established by the fact that the person is asleep when they experience it. If a person had an image appear for a moment after waking up or if they see something in the dark it is not considered a dream because they were awake when it occurred. Secondly, any sensory experience that is perceived while a person is asleep does not qualify as part of a dream. For example, if, while a person is sleeping, a door shuts and in their dream they hear a door is shut, this sensory experience is not part of the dream. Lastly, the images of dreams must be a result of lasting impressions of waking sensory experiences.

Practical philosophy 
Aristotle's practical philosophy covers areas such as ethics, politics, economics, and rhetoric.

Ethics 

Aristotle considered ethics to be a practical rather than theoretical study, i.e., one aimed at becoming good and doing good rather than knowing for its own sake. He wrote several treatises on ethics, most notably including the Nicomachean Ethics.

Aristotle taught that virtue has to do with the proper function (ergon) of a thing. An eye is only a good eye in so much as it can see, because the proper function of an eye is sight. Aristotle reasoned that humans must have a function specific to humans, and that this function must be an activity of the psuchē (soul) in accordance with reason (logos). Aristotle identified such an optimum activity (the virtuous mean, between the accompanying vices of excess or deficiency) of the soul as the aim of all human deliberate action, eudaimonia, generally translated as "happiness" or sometimes "well-being". To have the potential of ever being happy in this way necessarily requires a good character (ēthikē aretē), often translated as moral or ethical virtue or excellence.

Aristotle taught that to achieve a virtuous and potentially happy character requires a first stage of having the fortune to be habituated not deliberately, but by teachers, and experience, leading to a later stage in which one consciously chooses to do the best things. When the best people come to live life this way their practical wisdom (phronesis) and their intellect (nous) can develop with each other towards the highest possible human virtue, the wisdom of an accomplished theoretical or speculative thinker, or in other words, a philosopher.

Politics 

In addition to his works on ethics, which address the individual, Aristotle addressed the city in his work titled Politics. Aristotle considered the city to be a natural community. Moreover, he considered the city to be prior in importance to the family, which in turn is prior to the individual, "for the whole must of necessity be prior to the part". He famously stated that "man is by nature a political animal" and argued that humanity's defining factor among others in the animal kingdom is its rationality. Aristotle conceived of politics as being like an organism rather than like a machine, and as a collection of parts none of which can exist without the others. Aristotle's conception of the city is organic, and he is considered one of the first to conceive of the city in this manner.

The common modern understanding of a political community as a modern state is quite different from Aristotle's understanding. Although he was aware of the existence and potential of larger empires, the natural community according to Aristotle was the city (polis) which functions as a political "community" or "partnership" (koinōnia). The aim of the city is not just to avoid injustice or for economic stability, but rather to allow at least some citizens the possibility to live a good life, and to perform beautiful acts: "The political partnership must be regarded, therefore, as being for the sake of noble actions, not for the sake of living together." This is distinguished from modern approaches, beginning with social contract theory, according to which individuals leave the state of nature because of "fear of violent death" or its "inconveniences".

In Protrepticus, the character 'Aristotle' states:

As Plato's disciple Aristotle was rather critical concerning democracy and, following the outline of certain ideas from Plato's Statesman, he developed a coherent theory of integrating various forms of power into a so-called mixed state:

To illustrate this approach, Aristotle proposed a first-of-its-kind mathematical model of voting, albeit textually described, where the democratic principle of "one voter–one vote" is combined with the oligarchic "merit-weighted voting"; for relevant quotes and their translation into mathematical formulas see.

Economics 

Aristotle made substantial contributions to economic thought, especially to thought in the Middle Ages. In Politics, Aristotle addresses the city, property, and trade. His response to criticisms of private property, in Lionel Robbins's view, anticipated later proponents of private property among philosophers and economists, as it related to the overall utility of social arrangements. Aristotle believed that although communal arrangements may seem beneficial to society, and that although private property is often blamed for social strife, such evils in fact come from human nature. In Politics, Aristotle offers one of the earliest accounts of the origin of money. Money came into use because people became dependent on one another, importing what they needed and exporting the surplus. For the sake of convenience, people then agreed to deal in something that is intrinsically useful and easily applicable, such as iron or silver.

Aristotle's discussions on retail and interest was a major influence on economic thought in the Middle Ages. He had a low opinion of retail, believing that contrary to using money to procure things one needs in managing the household, retail trade seeks to make a profit. It thus uses goods as a means to an end, rather than as an end unto itself. He believed that retail trade was in this way unnatural. Similarly, Aristotle considered making a profit through interest unnatural, as it makes a gain out of the money itself, and not from its use.

Aristotle gave a summary of the function of money that was perhaps remarkably precocious for his time. He wrote that because it is impossible to determine the value of every good through a count of the number of other goods it is worth, the necessity arises of a single universal standard of measurement. Money thus allows for the association of different goods and makes them "commensurable". He goes on to state that money is also useful for future exchange, making it a sort of security. That is, "if we do not want a thing now, we shall be able to get it when we do want it".

Rhetoric and poetics 

Aristotle's Rhetoric proposes that a speaker can use three basic kinds of appeals to persuade his audience: ethos (an appeal to the speaker's character), pathos (an appeal to the audience's emotion), and logos (an appeal to logical reasoning). He also categorizes rhetoric into three genres: epideictic (ceremonial speeches dealing with praise or blame), forensic (judicial speeches over guilt or innocence), and deliberative (speeches calling on an audience to make a decision on an issue). Aristotle also outlines two kinds of rhetorical proofs: enthymeme (proof by syllogism) and paradeigma (proof by example).

Aristotle writes in his Poetics that epic poetry, tragedy, comedy, dithyrambic poetry, painting, sculpture, music, and dance are all fundamentally acts of mimesis ("imitation"), each varying in imitation by medium, object, and manner. He applies the term mimesis both as a property of a work of art and also as the product of the artist's intention and contends that the audience's realisation of the mimesis is vital to understanding the work itself. Aristotle states that mimesis is a natural instinct of humanity that separates humans from animals and that all human artistry "follows the pattern of nature". Because of this, Aristotle believed that each of the mimetic arts possesses what Stephen Halliwell calls "highly structured procedures for the achievement of their purposes." For example, music imitates with the media of rhythm and harmony, whereas dance imitates with rhythm alone, and poetry with language. The forms also differ in their object of imitation. Comedy, for instance, is a dramatic imitation of men worse than average; whereas tragedy imitates men slightly better than average. Lastly, the forms differ in their manner of imitation – through narrative or character, through change or no change, and through drama or no drama.

While it is believed that Aristotle's Poetics originally comprised two books – one on comedy and one on tragedy – only the portion that focuses on tragedy has survived. Aristotle taught that tragedy is composed of six elements: plot-structure, character, style, thought, spectacle, and lyric poetry. The characters in a tragedy are merely a means of driving the story; and the plot, not the characters, is the chief focus of tragedy. Tragedy is the imitation of action arousing pity and fear, and is meant to effect the catharsis of those same emotions. Aristotle concludes Poetics with a discussion on which, if either, is superior: epic or tragic mimesis. He suggests that because tragedy possesses all the attributes of an epic, possibly possesses additional attributes such as spectacle and music, is more unified, and achieves the aim of its mimesis in shorter scope, it can be considered superior to epic. Aristotle was a keen systematic collector of riddles, folklore, and proverbs; he and his school had a special interest in the riddles of the Delphic Oracle and studied the fables of Aesop.

Views on women 

Aristotle's analysis of procreation describes an active, ensouling masculine element bringing life to an inert, passive female element. The biological differences are a result of the fact that the female body is well-suited for reproduction, which changes her body temperature, which in turn makes her, in Aristotle's view, incapable of participating in political life. On this ground, proponents of feminist metaphysics have accused Aristotle of misogyny and sexism. However, Aristotle gave equal weight to women's happiness as he did to men's, and commented in his Rhetoric that the things that lead to happiness need to be in women as well as men.

Influence 

More than 2300 years after his death, Aristotle remains one of the most influential people who ever lived. He contributed to almost every field of human knowledge then in existence, and he was the founder of many new fields. According to the philosopher Bryan Magee, "it is doubtful whether any human being has ever known as much as he did". Among countless other achievements, Aristotle was the founder of formal logic, pioneered the study of zoology, and left every future scientist and philosopher in his debt through his contributions to the scientific method. Taneli Kukkonen, writing in The Classical Tradition, observes that his achievement in founding two sciences is unmatched, and his reach in influencing "every branch of intellectual enterprise" including Western ethical and political theory, theology, rhetoric and literary analysis is equally long. As a result, Kukkonen argues, any analysis of reality today "will almost certainly carry Aristotelian overtones ... evidence of an exceptionally forceful mind." Jonathan Barnes wrote that "an account of Aristotle's intellectual afterlife would be little less than a history of European thought".

Aristotle has been called the father of logic, biology, political science, zoology, embryology, natural law, scientific method, rhetoric, psychology, realism, criticism, individualism, teleology, and meteorology.

On his successor, Theophrastus 

Aristotle's pupil and successor, Theophrastus, wrote the History of Plants, a pioneering work in botany. Some of his technical terms remain in use, such as carpel from carpos, fruit, and pericarp, from pericarpion, seed chamber.
Theophrastus was much less concerned with formal causes than Aristotle was, instead pragmatically describing how plants functioned.

On later Greek philosophers 

The immediate influence of Aristotle's work was felt as the Lyceum grew into the Peripatetic school. Aristotle's students included Aristoxenus, Dicaearchus, Demetrius of Phalerum, Eudemos of Rhodes, Harpalus, Hephaestion, Mnason of Phocis, Nicomachus, and Theophrastus. Aristotle's influence over Alexander the Great is seen in the latter's bringing with him on his expedition a host of zoologists, botanists, and researchers. He had also learned a great deal about Persian customs and traditions from his teacher. Although his respect for Aristotle was diminished as his travels made it clear that much of Aristotle's geography was clearly wrong, when the old philosopher released his works to the public, Alexander complained "Thou hast not done well to publish thy acroamatic doctrines; for in what shall I surpass other men if those doctrines wherein I have been trained are to be all men's common property?"

On Hellenistic science 

After Theophrastus, the Lyceum failed to produce any original work. Though interest in Aristotle's ideas survived, they were generally taken unquestioningly. It is not until the age of Alexandria under the Ptolemies that advances in biology can be again found.

The first medical teacher at Alexandria, Herophilus of Chalcedon, corrected Aristotle, placing intelligence in the brain, and connected the nervous system to motion and sensation. Herophilus also distinguished between veins and arteries, noting that the latter pulse while the former do not. Though a few ancient atomists such as Lucretius challenged the teleological viewpoint of Aristotelian ideas about life, teleology (and after the rise of Christianity, natural theology) would remain central to biological thought essentially until the 18th and 19th centuries. Ernst Mayr states that there was "nothing of any real consequence in biology after Lucretius and Galen until the Renaissance."

On Byzantine scholars 

Greek Christian scribes played a crucial role in the preservation of Aristotle by copying all the extant Greek language manuscripts of the corpus. The first Greek Christians to comment extensively on Aristotle were Philoponus, Elias, and David in the sixth century, and Stephen of Alexandria in the early seventh century. John Philoponus stands out for having attempted a fundamental critique of Aristotle's views on the eternity of the world, movement, and other elements of Aristotelian thought. Philoponus questioned Aristotle's teaching of physics, noting its flaws and introducing the theory of impetus to explain his observations.

After a hiatus of several centuries, formal commentary by Eustratius and Michael of Ephesus reappeared in the late eleventh and early twelfth centuries, apparently sponsored by Anna Comnena.

On the medieval Islamic world 

Aristotle was one of the most revered Western thinkers in early Islamic theology. Most of the still extant works of Aristotle, as well as a number of the original Greek commentaries, were translated into Arabic and studied by Muslim philosophers, scientists and scholars. Averroes, Avicenna and Alpharabius, who wrote on Aristotle in great depth, also influenced Thomas Aquinas and other Western Christian scholastic philosophers. Alkindus greatly admired Aristotle's philosophy, and Averroes spoke of Aristotle as the "exemplar" for all future philosophers. Medieval Muslim scholars regularly described Aristotle as the "First Teacher". The title was later used by Western philosophers (as in the famous poem of Dante) who were influenced by the tradition of Islamic philosophy.

On medieval Europe 

With the loss of the study of ancient Greek in the early medieval Latin West, Aristotle was practically unknown there from c. AD 600 to c. 1100 except through the Latin translation of the Organon made by Boethius. In the twelfth and thirteenth centuries, interest in Aristotle revived and Latin Christians had translations made, both from Arabic translations, such as those by Gerard of Cremona, and from the original Greek, such as those by James of Venice and William of Moerbeke. After the Scholastic Thomas Aquinas wrote his Summa Theologica, working from Moerbeke's translations and calling Aristotle "The Philosopher", the demand for Aristotle's writings grew, and the Greek manuscripts returned to the West, stimulating a revival of Aristotelianism in Europe that continued into the Renaissance. These thinkers blended Aristotelian philosophy with Christianity, bringing the thought of Ancient Greece into the Middle Ages. Scholars such as Boethius, Peter Abelard, and John Buridan worked on Aristotelian logic.

The medieval English poet Chaucer describes his student as being happy by having

A cautionary medieval tale held that Aristotle advised his pupil Alexander to avoid the king's seductive mistress, Phyllis, but was himself captivated by her, and allowed her to ride him. Phyllis had secretly told Alexander what to expect, and he witnessed Phyllis proving that a woman's charms could overcome even the greatest philosopher's male intellect. Artists such as Hans Baldung produced a series of illustrations of the popular theme.

The Italian poet Dante says of Aristotle in The Divine Comedy:

Besides Dante's fellow poets, the classical figure that most influenced the Comedy is Aristotle. Dante built up the philosophy of the Comedy with the works of Aristotle as a foundation, just as the scholastics used Aristotle as the basis for their thinking. Dante knew Aristotle directly from Latin translations of his works and indirectly through quotations in the works of Albert Magnus. Dante even acknowledges Aristotle's influence explicitly in the poem, specifically when Virgil justifies the Inferno's structure by citing the Nicomachean Ethics.

On medieval Judaism 
Moses Maimonides (considered to be the foremost intellectual figure of medieval Judaism) adopted Aristotelianism from the Islamic scholars and based his Guide for the Perplexed on it and that became the basis of Jewish scholastic philosophy. Maimonides also considered Aristotle to be the greatest philosopher that ever lived, and styled him as the "chief of the philosophers". Also, in his letter to Samuel ibn Tibbon, Maimonides observes that there is no need for Samuel to study the writings of philosophers who preceded Aristotle because the works of the latter are "sufficient by themselves and [superior] to all that were written before them. His intellect, Aristotle's is the extreme limit of human intellect, apart from him upon whom the divine emanation has flowed forth to such an extent that they reach the level of prophecy, there being no level higher".

On Early Modern scientists 

In the Early Modern period, scientists such as William Harvey in England and Galileo Galilei in Italy reacted against the theories of Aristotle and other classical era thinkers like Galen, establishing new theories based to some degree on observation and experiment. Harvey demonstrated the circulation of the blood, establishing that the heart functioned as a pump rather than being the seat of the soul and the controller of the body's heat, as Aristotle thought. Galileo used more doubtful arguments to displace Aristotle's physics, proposing that bodies all fall at the same speed whatever their weight.

On 18th/19th-century thinkers 
The 19th-century German philosopher Friedrich Nietzsche has been said to have taken nearly all of his political philosophy from Aristotle. Aristotle rigidly separated action from production, and argued for the deserved subservience of some people ("natural slaves"), and the natural superiority (virtue, arete) of others. It was Martin Heidegger, not Nietzsche, who elaborated a new interpretation of Aristotle, intended to warrant his deconstruction of scholastic and philosophical tradition.

The English mathematician George Boole fully accepted Aristotle's logic, but decided "to go under, over, and beyond" it with his system of algebraic logic in his 1854 book The Laws of Thought. This gives logic a mathematical foundation with equations, enables it to solve equations as well as check validity, and allows it to handle a wider class of problems by expanding propositions of any number of terms, not just two.

Charles Darwin regarded Aristotle as the most important contributor to the subject of biology. In an 1882 letter he wrote that "Linnaeus and Cuvier have been my two gods, though in very different ways, but they were mere schoolboys to old Aristotle". Also, in later editions of the book "On the Origin of Species', Darwin traced evolutionary ideas as far back as Aristotle; the text he cites is a summary by Aristotle of the ideas of the earlier Greek philosopher Empedocles.

James Joyce's favoured philosopher was Aristotle, whom he considered to be "the greatest thinker of all times". Samuel Taylor Coleridge said: Everybody is born either a Platonist or an Aristotelian. Ayn Rand acknowledged Aristotle as her greatest influence and remarked that in the history of philosophy she could only recommend "three A's"—Aristotle, Aquinas, and Ayn Rand. She also regarded Aristotle as the greatest of all philosophers.
Karl Marx considered Aristotle to be the "greatest thinker of antiquity", and called him a "giant thinker", a "genius", and "the great scholar".

Modern rejection and rehabilitation 

During the 20th century, Aristotle's work was widely criticized. The philosopher Bertrand Russell
argued that "almost every serious intellectual advance has had to begin with an attack on some Aristotelian doctrine". Russell called Aristotle's ethics "repulsive", and labelled his logic "as definitely antiquated as Ptolemaic astronomy". Russell stated that these errors made it difficult to do historical justice to Aristotle, until one remembered what an advance he made upon all of his predecessors.

The Dutch historian of science Eduard Jan Dijksterhuis wrote that Aristotle and his predecessors showed the difficulty of science by "proceed[ing] so readily to frame a theory of such a general character" on limited evidence from their senses. In 1985, the biologist Peter Medawar could still state in "pure seventeenth century" tones that Aristotle had assembled "a strange and generally speaking rather tiresome farrago of hearsay, imperfect observation, wishful thinking and credulity amounting to downright gullibility".

By the start of the 21st century, however, Aristotle was taken more seriously: Kukkonen noted that "In the best 20th-century scholarship Aristotle comes alive as a thinker wrestling with the full weight of the Greek philosophical tradition." Alasdair MacIntyre has attempted to reform what he calls the Aristotelian tradition in a way that is anti-elitist and capable of disputing the claims of both liberals and Nietzscheans. Kukkonen observed, too, that "that most enduring of romantic images, Aristotle tutoring the future conqueror Alexander" remained current, as in the 2004 film Alexander, while the "firm rules" of Aristotle's theory of drama have ensured a role for the Poetics in Hollywood.

Biologists continue to be interested in Aristotle's thinking. Armand Marie Leroi has reconstructed Aristotle's biology, while Niko Tinbergen's four questions, based on Aristotle's four causes, are used to analyse animal behaviour; they examine function, phylogeny, mechanism, and ontogeny.

Surviving works

Corpus Aristotelicum 

The works of Aristotle that have survived from antiquity through medieval manuscript transmission are collected in the Corpus Aristotelicum. These texts, as opposed to Aristotle's lost works, are technical philosophical treatises from within Aristotle's school. Reference to them is made according to the organization of Immanuel Bekker's Royal Prussian Academy edition (Aristotelis Opera edidit Academia Regia Borussica, Berlin, 1831–1870), which in turn is based on ancient classifications of these works.

Loss and preservation 

Aristotle wrote his works on papyrus scrolls, the common writing medium of that era. His writings are divisible into two groups: the "exoteric", intended for the public, and the "esoteric", for use within the Lyceum school. Aristotle's "lost" works stray considerably in characterization from the surviving Aristotelian corpus. Whereas the lost works appear to have been originally written with a view to subsequent publication, the surviving works mostly resemble lecture notes not intended for publication. Cicero's description of Aristotle's literary style as "a river of gold" must have applied to the published works, not the surviving notes. A major question in the history of Aristotle's works is how the exoteric writings were all lost, and how the ones now possessed came to be found. The consensus is that Andronicus of Rhodes collected the esoteric works of Aristotle's school which existed in the form of smaller, separate works, distinguished them from those of Theophrastus and other Peripatetics, edited them, and finally compiled them into the more cohesive, larger works as they are known today.

Legacy

Depictions 
Paintings

Aristotle has been depicted by major artists including Lucas Cranach the Elder, Justus van Gent, Raphael, Paolo Veronese, Jusepe de Ribera, Rembrandt, and Francesco Hayez over the centuries. Among the best-known depictions is Raphael's fresco The School of Athens, in the Vatican's Apostolic Palace, where the figures of Plato and Aristotle are central to the image, at the architectural vanishing point, reflecting their importance. Rembrandt's Aristotle with a Bust of Homer, too, is a celebrated work, showing the knowing philosopher and the blind Homer from an earlier age: as the art critic Jonathan Jones writes, "this painting will remain one of the greatest and most mysterious in the world, ensnaring us in its musty, glowing, pitch-black, terrible knowledge of time."

Sculptures

Eponyms 
The Aristotle Mountains in Antarctica are named after Aristotle. He was the first person known to conjecture, in his book Meteorology, the existence of a landmass in the southern high-latitude region and called it Antarctica. Aristoteles is a crater on the Moon bearing the classical form of Aristotle's name.

See also 
 Aristotelian Society
 Conimbricenses
 Perfectionism

References

Notes

Citations

Sources

Further reading 
The secondary literature on Aristotle is vast. The following is only a small selection.

 Ackrill, J. L. (1997). Essays on Plato and Aristotle, Oxford University Press.
 
 
 
  These translations are available in several places online; see External links.
 Bakalis, Nikolaos. (2005). Handbook of Greek Philosophy: From Thales to the Stoics Analysis and Fragments, Trafford Publishing, .
 
 Bolotin, David (1998). An Approach to Aristotle's Physics: With Particular Attention to the Role of His Manner of Writing. Albany: SUNY Press. A contribution to our understanding of how to read Aristotle's scientific works.
 Burnyeat, Myles F. et al. (1979). Notes on Book Zeta of Aristotle's Metaphysics. Oxford: Sub-faculty of Philosophy.
 
 
 Code, Alan (1995). Potentiality in Aristotle's Science and Metaphysics, Pacific Philosophical Quarterly 76.
 
 
 De Groot, Jean (2014). Aristotle's Empiricism: Experience and Mechanics in the 4th century BC, Parmenides Publishing, .
 Frede, Michael (1987). Essays in Ancient Philosophy. Minneapolis: University of Minnesota Press.
 
 Gendlin, Eugene T. (2012). Line by Line Commentary on Aristotle's De Anima , Volume 1: Books I & II; Volume 2: Book III. The Focusing Institute.
 Gill, Mary Louise (1989). Aristotle on Substance: The Paradox of Unity. Princeton University Press.
 
 
 
 
 
 Jori, Alberto (2003). Aristotele, Bruno Mondadori (Prize 2003 of the "International Academy of the History of Science"), .
 
 Knight, Kelvin (2007). Aristotelian Philosophy: Ethics and Politics from Aristotle to MacIntyre, Polity Press.
 Lewis, Frank A. (1991). Substance and Predication in Aristotle. Cambridge University Press.
 Lord, Carnes (1984). Introduction to The Politics, by Aristotle. Chicago University Press.
 Loux, Michael J. (1991). Primary Ousia: An Essay on Aristotle's Metaphysics Ζ and Η. Ithaca, NY: Cornell University Press.
 Maso, Stefano (Ed.), Natali, Carlo (Ed.), Seel, Gerhard (Ed.) (2012) Reading Aristotle: Physics VII. 3: What is Alteration? Proceedings of the International ESAP-HYELE Conference, Parmenides Publishing. .
 
  [Reprinted in J. Barnes, M. Schofield, and R.R.K. Sorabji, eds.(1975). Articles on Aristotle Vol 1. Science. London: Duckworth 14–34.]
 
 
 Reeve, C. D. C. (2000). Substantial Knowledge: Aristotle's Metaphysics. Hackett.
 
 
 Scaltsas, T. (1994). Substances and Universals in Aristotle's Metaphysics. Cornell University Press.
 Strauss, Leo (1964). "On Aristotle's Politics", in The City and Man, Rand McNally.

External links 

 
 
 At the Internet Encyclopedia of Philosophy:
 
 At the Internet Classics Archive
 From the Stanford Encyclopedia of Philosophy:
 
 
 

Collections of works
 
 At Massachusetts Institute of Technology
 
 
 
 
  Perseus Project at Tufts University
 At the University of Adelaide 
  P. Remacle
 The 11-volume 1837 Bekker edition of Aristotle's Works in Greek (PDFDJVU)

 

384 BC births
322 BC deaths
4th-century BC mathematicians
4th-century BC philosophers
4th-century BC writers
Academic philosophers
Acting theorists
Ancient Greek biologists
Ancient Greek epistemologists
Ancient Greek ethicists
Ancient Greek logicians
Ancient Greek mathematicians
Ancient Greek metaphysicians
Ancient Greek philosophers of language
Ancient Greek philosophers of mind
Ancient Greek physicists
Ancient Greek political philosophers
Ancient Greek political refugees
Ancient Greek philosophers of art
Ancient literary critics
Ancient Stagirites
Aphorists
Aristotelian philosophers
Attic Greek writers
Ancient Greek cosmologists
Greek male writers
Greek geologists
Greek meteorologists
Greek social commentators
Humor researchers
Irony theorists
Metic philosophers in Classical Athens
Natural philosophers
Ontologists
Peripatetic philosophers
Philosophers and tutors of Alexander the Great
Philosophers of ancient Chalcidice
Philosophers of culture
Philosophers of education
Philosophers of history
Philosophers of law
Philosophers of literature
Philosophers of logic
Philosophers of love
Philosophers of psychology
Philosophers of science
Philosophers of time
Philosophers of sexuality
Philosophers of technology
Philosophical logic
Philosophical theists
Philosophy academics
Philosophy writers
Rhetoric theorists
Social philosophers
Students of Plato
Trope theorists
Virtue ethicists
Zoologists
Natural law ethicists